Ben Akabueze is a Nigerian Chartered Accountant and the current Director General of the Budget office for the Federal Republic of Nigeria. He served as the CEO of NAL Bank Plc (now Sterling Bank Plc) and was two terms Commissioner for Economic Planning and Budget with the Lagos State Government.

Education and personal life
Akabueze obtained a B.Sc in Accounting from the University of Lagos and a postgraduate degree in Business Administration and Management from the Lagos Business School.

He was the Pastor-in-charge of Lagos Province 39 of the Redeemed Christian Church of God till his appointment with the Federal Government and is married to Ngozi, the CEO of Foundation for Sapphire (a non profit organisation).

Career
Akabueze was elected the chief executive officer of NAL Bank Plc in 2000 a post he retained till its merger in 2005 to become Sterling Bank Plc. He was thereafter in 2007 appointed as the Commissioner for Economic Planning and Budget by the Lagos State Government till 2015. In February 2016 he was appointed as Special Adviser to the President on National Planning and was made the Director General for Budget office in June. On 17 May 2020, President Muhammadu Buhari reappointed Akabueze as the Director General of Budget Office. Fellow, Institute of Chartered Accountants of Nigeria (ICAN), Fellow, Institute of Credit Administration (FCA) and Honorary Member, Chartered Institute of Bankers (CIBN)

Ben Akabueze is also the head pastor of the Kings Court Parish of the Redeemed Christian Church of God (RCCG).

Public speaking 
As the director general of Nigeria's Debt Management Office he has engaged in public speaking at several events including Lagos Business School breakfast club where he spoke on budget and national strategy; leverage and synergy potentials, KPMG's Nigeria Tax Breakfast seminar where he made a presentation on key objectives and expected impact of the FGN 2021 Budget making a case for the need for increased domestic revenue by state governments and other events where he continues to advocate for increased domestic revenue generation and more efficient management of allocated revenue.

References

External links 
 https://rccgtkclagos.com/our-head-pastor/
https://www.budgetoffice.gov.ng/
https://www.youtube.com/watch?v=mSrXzeLvGfk

University of Lagos alumni
21st-century Nigerian economists
Nigerian business executives
Living people
Year of birth missing (living people)